is a Japanese footballer who plays as a defender for MIO Biwako Shiga, on loan from Yokohama F. Marinos.

Career statistics

Club
.

References

External links

2002 births
Living people
Association football people from Wakayama Prefecture
Japanese footballers
Association football defenders
J1 League players
Yokohama F. Marinos players
Japan Football League players
ReinMeer Aomori players
MIO Biwako Shiga players